Bennett Valley Union School District is a public school district based in Santa Rosa, in Sonoma County, California, United States. It operates two elementary schools, Yulupa School and Strawberry School. The district served 983 students in the 2011–2012 school year.

References

External links
 

School districts in Sonoma County, California